Mbam is a village in the Fatick Region of Senegal.

Mbam or MBAM may also refer to:

 Malwarebytes' Anti-Malware, software
 N,N'-Methylenebisacrylamide (MBAm), a chemical